Jessica Mei Li (born 27 August 1995) is an English actress. She is best known for her role as Alina Starkov in the Netflix fantasy series Shadow and Bone.

Early life and education
Li was born in Brighton, East Sussex to an English mother and a Chinese father who was raised in Hong Kong. She grew up in Redhill, Surrey and has an older brother. Li attended Reigate College from 2010 to 2012 and began studying French and Spanish at the University of Sussex, but eventually dropped out. For nearly two years, Li worked as a teaching assistant for children with special needs at secondary school.

Li joined the National Youth Theatre in 2015 and trained part-time at Identity School of Acting from 2016 to 2017.

Career
Li made her professional stage debut in February 2019 playing the role of Claudia Casswell in All About Eve at Noel Coward Theatre, directed and adapted for the stage by Ivo van Hove, alongside Gillian Anderson and Lily James.

In October 2019, it was announced Li would star in the lead role of Alina Starkov in the 2021 Netflix series Shadow and Bone, an adaptation of Leigh Bardugo's Grishaverse fantasy book series Shadow and Bone and Six of Crows. Li initially had reservations about auditioning for the character of Alina Starkov, whose ethnicity was changed from white to mixed race for the show, citing concerns about whether the change was being made due to a diversity quota. However, during the audition process, Li observed that the change in Starkov's ethnicity "wasn't just a diversity box ticker" and "was something to help build the world and to help build her character."

Li appears as Lara Chung in Edgar Wright's 2021 film Last Night in Soho. She appeared on The Wayne Ayers Podcast in 2023.

Personal life
Li was diagnosed with ADHD as an adult.

Li has spoken on growing up with a lack of positive Asian and biracial representation onscreen. Her conflict over her dual heritage was compounded when she began auditioning, where they noticed mixed-race roles would sometimes go to fully Asian or white actors. In an April 2021 interview, Li emphasized the importance of nuanced portrayals of Asians in media.

Li is queer and identifies as a gender-nonconforming person, yet considers herself female.

Filmography

Film

Television

Music videos

Stage

References

External links

Living people
21st-century English actresses
Actresses from Brighton
Actresses from Surrey
British actresses of Chinese descent
English people of Hong Kong descent
English film actresses
English female taekwondo practitioners
English television actresses
LGBT actresses
British LGBT actors
National Youth Theatre members
People from Redhill, Surrey
1995 births